Stephen F. Austin School is located on 319 Lipscomb Street in Fort Worth, Texas. Designed by the firm Messer, Sanguinet and Messer, the school opened in 1892 as the Sixth Ward School or the Broadway School. The two-story structure was built utilizing the Richardsonian Romanesque style popularized by the architect Henry Hobson Richardson. It was renamed The Stephen F. Austin Elementary School in 1904.  In 1909, an addition was constructed on the north part of the building. The school closed in 1977. Williamson-Dickie Manufacturing Company purchased the building in 1980 and used it as its corporate headquarters.

It was added to the National Register of Historic Places on March 10, 1983.

Photo gallery

See also

National Register of Historic Places listings in Tarrant County, Texas

References

External links

African Methodist Episcopal churches in Texas
National Register of Historic Places in Fort Worth, Texas
Gothic Revival architecture in Texas
School buildings completed in 1914
Buildings and structures in Fort Worth, Texas
1914 establishments in Texas